Four Songs or 4 Songs may refer to:

Music

Classical compositions
A number of compositions by Nikolai Rimsky-Korsakov (1844–1908)
Four Songs, a 1954 composition by Igor Stravinsky
Four Songs (original title Vier Lieder), Op. 2, a 1909/10 composition by Alban Berg (1885–1935)

Albums and EPs
Four Songs (Alexi Murdoch EP), 2002
Four Songs (Jonezetta EP), 2005
Four Songs (Live EP), 1991
Four Songs (Matt Pond PA EP), 2004
Four Songs by Arthur Russell, a 2007 tribute EP
4 Songs, a 1988 EP by The Bats
4 Songs, a 1991 by Gray Matter
4 Songs, a 2006 EP by Belleruche

See also 
 Vier ernste Gesänge (Four Serious Songs) Op. 121, a song cycle by Johannes Brahms
 Four Last Songs, a song cycle by Richard Strauss
Four Orchestral Songs, a composition by Arnold Schoenberg
 Quatre chansons cambodgiennes (1931) and Quatre chansons françaises (1933), by Henri Casadesus
 "Four Songs for Voice, Violin and Piano", by Arthur Bliss
 Cuatro canciones sefardíes (1965), by Joaquín Rodrigo
 Quatre Chansons Françaises (1928), by Benjamin Britten
 "Four Songs For Mezzo-Soprano And Piano", by David Dubery
 Quatro Canciones de García Lorca Op. 8, by Jouni Kaipainen
 A number of compositions by Edvard Grieg